Dactylopsaron is a monotypic genus of percomorph fish from the subfamily Hemerocoetinae. The only species in the genus, Dactylopsaron dimorphicum is found in the eastern South Pacific on the Salas y Gomez ridge and the adjacent part of the Nazca Ridge.

References

Percophidae
Monotypic fish genera